Hacienda Azucarera la Esperanza was a 2265-acre sugarcane plantation in Manatí, Puerto Rico which was founded in the 1830s and by the 1860s was one of the largest in Puerto Rico. It remained operational from 1830 - 1880.

History 
The plantation depended on mechanized technology  along with slaves which numbered 175 in 1873. The first mill on the plantation produced 100-150 tons of raw sugar every harvest. A second mill is estimated to have generated 200 tons while a third mill produced between 500-600 tons.

Two steam engines were purchased to mechanize sugar production at the hacienda: one in 1841 and another in 1861. The Steam trapiche purchased in 1861 remains on the property making it the last known engine of its kind that remains preserved. The Hacienda La Esperanza steam engine has been designated a National Historic Mechanical Engineering Landmark. Today the entire property is owned by the Puerto Rico Conservation Trust (FCPR, for the initials in Spanish) which preserves and protects it, the property includes some of the only coastal forest left in the region.

Owner

José Ramon Fernández (1808–1883), an influential, conservative politician and businessman, owned Hacienda Azucarera la Esperanza. Ramon was named  by Spain during a tumultuous time in Puerto Rico.The crisis allowed Ramon to purchase more land and expand the Hacienda.

Ramon, the 1st Marquis of La Esperanza was the wealthiest sugar baron in Puerto Rico in the 19th century. He was also one of the most powerful men of the entire Spanish Caribbean.

Gallery

See also

 Hacienda Mercedita
 Culture of Puerto Rico

References

External links

Historic American Engineering Record in Puerto Rico
National Register of Historic Places in Puerto Rico
National Register of Historic Places in Manatí, Puerto Rico
Sugar plantations in the Caribbean
Azucarera la Esperanza
1830s establishments in Puerto Rico
Sugar industry in Puerto Rico
Buildings and structures completed in 1830
1830 establishments in the Spanish Empire